The 2011–12 Serie A (known as the Serie A TIM after its headline sponsors) was the 110th season of top-tier Italian football, the 80th in a round-robin tournament, and the second since its organization under a league committee separate from Serie B. It began on 3 September 2011 and ended on 13 May 2012. The league was originally scheduled to start on 27 August, but this was delayed due to a strike by the players. The fixtures were drawn up on 27 July 2011.

The league title was won by Juventus, winning its 28th official Serie A title or scudetto, and first since the 2002–03 Serie A. The team completed the season undefeated, becoming the first team to do so in a 38-game league season in Italy; Perugia were undefeated in the 30-game 1978–79 Serie A, in which they finished second in the table, while Milan were unbeaten and won the title in the 34-game 1991–92 Serie A.

Since Italy dropped from third to fourth place in the UEFA association coefficient rankings at the end of the 2010–11 season, the league lost a group stage berth for the UEFA Champions League from the 2012–13 season.

Rule changes
The rules for the registration of non-EU (or non-EFTA or Swiss) nationals transferred from abroad were revised in the summer of 2011. Clubs could now sign two non-EU players. This was a reverse of the decision made the previous summer in the wake of Italy's failure at the 2010 World Cup that limited clubs to the signing of just one such player.

Teams

Stadia and locations

Personnel and sponsorship

(*) Promoted from Serie B

Managerial changes
In Italy, football managers are only permitted to manage one club per season. For this purpose, the "season" is defined as starting when its first match kicks off, so Roberto Donadoni and Stefano Pioli, who lost their job at Cagliari and Palermo on 12 and 31 August 2011 were able to take respectively the Parma job in January 2012 and the Bologna job in October 2011 because the first matches were not until 9 September 2011.

League table

Results

Statistics

Top goalscorers

Hat-tricks

Number of teams by region

References

2011-12
1
Ita